Federal Highway 68D is a toll highway in the Mexican state of Nayarit. It connects the cities of Compostela and Chapalilla. The road is operated by Caminos y Puentes Federales, which charges cars 38 pesos to travel Highway 68D.

References 

Mexican Federal Highways